Masonic Temple Building may refer to:

 Masonic Temple Building (Denver, Colorado), listed on the National Register of Historic Places (NRHP) in Colorado
 Masonic Temple Building (Maywood, Illinois), listed on the NRHP in Illinois
 Masonic Temple Building (Oak Park, Illinois), listed on the NRHP in Illinois
 Masonic Temple Building (Stuart, Iowa), listed on the NRHP in Iowa
 Masonic Temple Building (Cadillac, Michigan), listed on the NRHP in Michigan
 Masonic Temple Building (East Lansing, Michigan), listed on the NRHP in Michigan
 Masonic Temple Building (Kalamazoo, Michigan), listed on the NRHP in Michigan
 Masonic Temple Building (Lansing, Michigan), listed on the NRHP in Michigan
 Masonic Temple Building (Marshall, Michigan), listed on the NRHP in Michigan
 Masonic Temple Building, Blount Street (Raleigh, North Carolina), listed on the NRHP in North Carolina
 Masonic Temple Building, Fayetteville Street (Raleigh, North Carolina), listed on the NRHP in North Carolina
 Masonic Temple Building (Shelby, North Carolina), listed on the NRHP in North Carolina
 Masonic Temple Building (Vermilion, Ohio), listed on the NRHP in Ohio
 Masonic Temple Building (Zanesville, Ohio), listed on the NRHP in Ohio
 Masonic Temple Building (Viroqua, Wisconsin), listed on the NRHP in Wisconsin
 Masonic Temple Building (Tacoma, Washington)

See also
List of Masonic buildings
List of Masonic buildings in the United States
Masonic Hall (disambiguation)
Masonic Temple (disambiguation)
 Masonic Building (disambiguation)